Grünhut Lazar (May 10, 1850 – February 2, 1913) was an Hungarian rabbi and writer. He is especially renowned for his research & publications in the field of Midrash.

Lazar was born at Gerenda, Hungary on May 10, 1850. Receiving his diploma as rabbi while a mere youth, he went to Berlin, where he attended the lectures of Dr. Israel Hildesheimer at the rabbinical seminary, as well as those at the university. He graduated (Ph.D.) from the University of Bern. For eleven years he officiated as rabbi at Temesvár, Hungary.

In 1892, he moved to Jerusalem on invitation to be director of the Jewish orphanage at Jerusalem. There he was active in teaching and in Zionist political activism. He was active in the Mizrachi movement and was their representative in the Zionist Congress.

He died in Petah Tikva on February 2, 1913.

Grünhut's works 
 "Kritische Untersuchung des Midrasch Kohelet Rabbah" (Berlin, 1892);
 "Das Verbot des Genusses von Gesäuertem am Rüsttage des Pessachfestes," in "Zeit. für Evangelische Theologie," 1894–98;
 "Midrash Shir ha-Shirim"  (Jerusalem, 1897);
 "Sefer ha-Liḳḳuṭim," i.-vi. (Jerusalem, 1898–1903);
 "Ezra und Nehemia, Kritisch Erläutert," part 1 (ib. 1899);
 "Saadia Gaon und Sein Commentar zum Buche Daniel" (St. Petersburg, 1899);
 "Saadia Gaon und Sein Commentar zu (Daniel,) Ezra und Nehemia" (ib. 1902);
 "Yalkut ha-Machiri zu den SprüchenSalomos" (Jerusalem, 1902);
 "Die Reisebeschreibungen des R. Benjamin von Tudela", published from manuscripts, with translations and introduction (ib. 1903).

Bibliography

Jewish Encyclopedia bibliography 
 Das Rabbiner-Seminar zu Berlin, p. 41, Berlin, 1898.S.

other bibliography 
 Getzel Kressel, Cyclopaedia of modern Hebrew Literature (Leksīqōn has-sifrūt hā'ibrīt be-dōrōt ha-aharōnīm) 1965, (Hebrew).

References 
  .

1850 births
1913 deaths
Austro-Hungarian emigrants to the Ottoman Empire
University of Bern alumni
Zionist activists
Jews in Ottoman Palestine
Jewish educators
Religious Zionist Orthodox rabbis
Talmudists
Contributors to the Jewish Encyclopedia
Burials at Segula Cemetery